Greatest Hits Volume One is the first greatest hits album by American country music artist Toby Keith. It was released on October 20, 1998 by Mercury Records and was his final album for the label, where he had been from the start of his career in 1993 to 1998. It features singles from his first four studio albums, as well as the newly recorded tracks "Getcha Some", and "If a Man Answers". Both of these tracks were released as singles, in 1998 and 1999, respectively. While "Getcha Some" peaked at #18 on the Hot Country Songs charts, "If a Man Answers" reached #44 on the same chart, becoming the first single of Keith's career to miss the Top 40. It is Keith's only compilation album not to feature singles in chronological order.

In April 2003, the album was certified Double Platinum by the RIAA.

Track listing

Personnel on New Tracks
Adapted from liner notes.

Mike Brignardello - bass guitar
Mark Casstevens - acoustic guitar
Dan Dugmore - steel guitar
Paul Franklin - steel guitar 
Kenny Greenberg - electric guitar
Owen Hale - drums
Roger Hawkins - drums
David Hood - bass guitar
Clayton Ivey - piano
Toby Keith - lead vocals
Will McFarland - electric guitar
Terry McMillan - harmonica, percussion
Steve Nathan - keyboards, organ
Brent Rowan - electric guitar
John Wesley Ryles - background vocals
Dennis Wilson - background vocals
Curtis Young - background vocals

Charts

Weekly charts

Year-end charts

References

1998 greatest hits albums
Toby Keith compilation albums
Mercury Records compilation albums
Albums produced by Toby Keith
Albums produced by Harold Shedd